Kirk R. Thatcher (born February 14, 1962) is an American writer, producer, television and film director, an Internet video director, and a production designer.

Personal life
Thatcher was born and raised in Los Angeles, California. In high school, he met Joe Johnston, a production designer for Star Wars.  Johnston would later work with Thatcher on his first job in the industry, as a technical assistant on the ILM creature crew of Return of the Jedi.

Film
Thatcher began his career at eighteen, leaving UCLA Film School to work at George Lucas' special effects facility, Industrial Light and Magic (ILM). Thatcher was the production designer on David Fincher's first music videos and spent over a year creating the look for a number of Rick Springfield and The Motels videos. Subsequently, Thatcher was hired by Leonard Nimoy to associate produce Star Trek IV: The Voyage Home. He also portrayed "Punk on the Bus", a discourteous commuter loudly playing the song "I Hate You" on a boombox in the film. Thatcher wrote and performed the song, recording it with sound designer Mark Mangini. Thatcher earns no additional money for the non-speaking role of "Punk" but does receive "like 8-cent residuals" for the song.

Thatcher's first directorial effort was in 2002, with It's a Very Merry Muppet Christmas Movie for NBC, which drew more than 11 million viewers. Thatcher has co-written several Muppet films including Muppet Treasure Island (1996) and directed three television movies, including A Muppets Christmas: Letters to Santa (2008) and The Muppets' Wizard of Oz (2005), which premiered at Robert De Niro's Tribeca Film Festival.

In 2015, Thatcher directed Turkey Hollow, a Thanksgiving-themed TV movie for The Jim Henson Company which aired on Lifetime. Thatcher is also credited as one of the three writers of the film, alongside Jim Henson and Jerry Juhl. Kirk Thatcher makes a cameo appearance as "Punk Rock Guy" in the 2017 film Spider-Man: Homecoming, as a homage to his role as "Punk on Bus" in Star Trek IV: The Voyage Home.

In October 2021, Thatcher wrote and directed Muppets Haunted Mansion.

Television
Kirk Thatcher was a supervising producer on the Emmy Award-winning ABC series Muppets Tonight.

Thatcher has also written episodes for the Cartoon Network series Foster's Home for Imaginary Friends, and directed episodes of Nickelodeon's series LazyTown, PBS' Sid the Science Kid, and Comedy Central's Crank Yankers.

In 2014, Thatcher was seen on the SyFy Network's series Jim Henson's Creature Shop Challenge, where he appeared in each episode as a judge for the competition.

Thatcher returned to the Star Trek franchise in 2019, narrating in the Star Trek: Short Treks episode Ephraim and Dot. In 2022 he reprised his "Punk on the Bus" role in the second season of Star Trek: Picard, this time playing an older and wiser version of the character from Star Trek IV: The Voyage Home. That same year, he announced via his Instagram page that he'd be writing for Mystery Science Theater 3000.

Internet and commercials
Kirk Thatcher has also directed The Muppets' "Bohemian Rhapsody", which won the "Viral Video" category in the 14th Annual Webby Awards.  He has also directed 2015 Muppet Music videos "Jungle Boogie" and "Kodachrome."

References

External links
 Official site
 

1962 births
Living people
American film directors
American music video directors
American screenwriters
American television directors
American television writers